Easier may refer to:
 "Easier" (Lisa Stansfield song), 2004
 "Easier" (5 Seconds of Summer song), 2019
 Easier (recording studio), a recording studio located in Los Angeles, California and Joshua Tree, California